Henry Vannoy, real name Alexandre Henri Alanic (1819 – Paris, 1 November 1889), was a 19th-century French actor and playwright.

An actor at the Théâtre de l'Odéon where he distinguished himself in the role of Cocardasse in Le Bossu, from 1850 he became one of the main comedians of the Théâtre de la Porte-Saint-Martin. He also contributed to the writing of some boulevard plays.

Works 
1851: Le Colporteur, comédie-vaudeville in 2 acts, with Amédée de Jallais,
1875: La Vie de Trombalgo,
1875: À Sa Majesté la reine Isabelle, Les Deux cousins

Bibliography 
 Henry Lyonnet, Dictionnaire des comédiens français (ceux d'hier), 1910
 Georges d'Heylli, Dictionnaire des pseudonymes, 1977, (p. 447)
 Michael Peschke, Encyclopédie Internationale des Pseudonymes, 2006, (p. 34)

19th-century French male actors
French male stage actors
19th-century French dramatists and playwrights
1819 births
1889 deaths